This is a list of the royal consort of the Kingdom of León.

It is, in part, a continuation of the list of Asturian royal consorts.

Royal Consorts of León

House of Alfonso

House of Jiménez

House of Burgundy

House of Trastámara 

Ferdinand II of Aragon (1452–1516), husband of Queen Isabella of Castile and León, and Philip of Habsburg (1478–1506), husband of Queen Joanna of Castile and León, were kings of the Crown of Castile-León.

House of Habsburg 

At 1556, the union of the Spanish kingdoms is generally called Spain and Mary I of England (consort of King Philip II) is the first Queen Consort of Spain.

See also 

List of Hispanic consorts
List of Castilian consorts
List of Galician consorts
List of Aragonese consorts
List of Asturian consorts
List of Galician monarchs
List of Leonese monarchs
List of Navarrese consorts
List of Spanish consorts
List of consorts of Portugal

Notes

Sources

 
Leonose queens consorts, List of
Kingdom of León
Leon